Lee Eun-kyung (born 15 July 1972) is a South Korean archer and Olympic champion.

She competed at the 1992 Summer Olympics in Barcelona, where she won a gold medal with the South Korean archery team.

She also competed at the Asian Games winning a gold medal in the team and silver in the individual events in 1990; a gold medal in the individual and bronze in the team events in 1994; and a gold medal in the team and silver medal in the individual events in 1998.

References

External links
 

1972 births
Living people
South Korean female archers
Olympic archers of South Korea
Archers at the 1992 Summer Olympics
Olympic gold medalists for South Korea
Olympic medalists in archery
Asian Games medalists in archery
Archers at the 1990 Asian Games
Archers at the 1994 Asian Games
Archers at the 1998 Asian Games
World Archery Championships medalists
Medalists at the 1992 Summer Olympics
Asian Games gold medalists for South Korea
Asian Games silver medalists for South Korea
Asian Games bronze medalists for South Korea
Medalists at the 1990 Asian Games
Medalists at the 1994 Asian Games
Medalists at the 1998 Asian Games
20th-century South Korean women